KVOG (1530 AM) is a radio station licensed to Hagåtña, Guam, United States, serving the island of Guam. The station is currently owned by Guam Power II.

The station went silent on October 18, 2019. On November 13, 2019, the station was granted a special temporary authority to remain silent, which is set to expire on May 11, 2020.

References

External links
 
 

VOG
Hagåtña, Guam